Creating Blues on the Other Side is an album by American jazz vibraphonist Mike Mainieri recorded in 1962 and released on the Argo label.

Track listing
All compositions by Mike Mainieri except where noted
 "Blues on the Other Side" – 3:47	
 "If I Were a Bell" (Frank Loesser) – 5:29	
 "Tenderly" (Walter Gross, Jack Lawrence) – 6:17	
 "B.R. Blues" – 5:03	
 "When I Fall in Love" (Victor Young, Edward Heyman) – 5:27	
 "Waltzin' In and Out" – 6:19

Personnel
Mike Mainieri – vibraphone
Bruce Martin – piano
Julie Ruggiero – double-bass
Joe Porcaro – drums

References 

Argo Records albums
Mike Mainieri albums
1962 albums
Albums recorded at Van Gelder Studio
Albums produced by Esmond Edwards